Crosslink Capital is a leading early-stage venture capital firm with an asset management business that continues into the public equity market for fast-growing companies. The firm has over $2.0B assets under management that it invests in consumer and enterprise businesses. Crosslink Capital was founded in 1989 and has offices in San Francisco, California and Woodside, California.

History
Crosslink traces its roots to 1989 with the formation of its first venture capital fund within Robertson, Stephens. Michael Stark and Sy Kaufman were the general partners of the fund and ran a distinct investment team. In January 1999, Crosslink was formed when the management team completed a management buyout and began operating as an independent organization named Crosslink Capital. All funds and relevant employees were transferred to Crosslink at that time.

Investments
Crosslink Capital prefers to partner with companies in venture capital at the earliest stages across all sectors. Crosslink invests in both private and public companies. Some of Crosslink's investments include:

 Ancestry.com (exited)
 Pandora Radio (exited)
Coupa (exited)
Equinix (exited)
BuildingConnected (exited)
Bleacher Report (exited)
Virage Logic (exited) 
ServiceMax (exited)
Vungle Inc. (exited)
Casper
Postmates
Chime
Molekule
Verodin
Descartes Labs
Weave
Venturebeat
Armory

References

External links

Venture capital firms of the United States
Companies based in San Francisco
Financial services companies established in 1989
Angel investors